The 2014–15 Idaho Vandals men's basketball team represented the University of Idaho during the 2014–15 NCAA Division I men's basketball season. The Vandals, led by seventh year head coach Don Verlin, played their home games at the Cowan Spectrum, with a few early season games at Memorial Gym, and were members of the Big Sky Conference. This was their first year returning to the Big Sky, the conference they were charter members of and called home from 1963–1996. They finished the season 13–17, 8–10 in Big Sky play to finish in a tie for seventh place. They lost in the quarterfinals of the Big Sky tournament to Eastern Washington.

Roster

Schedule

|-
!colspan=9 style="background:#B18E5F; color:#000000;"| Exhibition

|-
!colspan=9 style="background:#B18E5F; color:#000000;"| Regular season

|-
!colspan=9 style="background:#B18E5F; color:#000000;"| Big Sky tournament

References

Idaho
Idaho Vandals men's basketball seasons
Idaho
Idaho